John II, Count of Nevers (known as Jean de Clamecy, prior to acquiring title of "Count of Nevers"; 1415–1491) was a French noble.

Life

John was the son of Philip II, Count of Nevers by his wife, Bonne of Artois, daughter of Philip of Artois, Count of Eu.  John's elder brother, Charles I, Count of Nevers and Rethel, had no legitimate children, and so on his death in 1464 his titles passed to John. In 1472, his uncle Charles of Artois, Count of Eu, died, and having no legitimate children, his title also passed to John.

John fought in the army of his stepfather Philip the Good and was active in Picardy (1434), Calais (1436), Luxembourg (1443), and Flanders (1453). But he clashed with Philip's successor, Charles the Bold, and he defected to King Louis XI of France.

He fought alongside Louis XI in the War of the Public Weal and became Lieutenant General of Normandy.

Family
John was first married on 24 November 1435 in Amiens, to Jacqueline d'Ailly, Dame d'Engelmuenster (died 1470), they had two children:
 Elizabeth (c. 1439 – 21 June 1483), who married John I, Duke of Cleves.
 Philip (1446–1452).

They had one child:
 Charlotte, Countess of Rethel (c. 1472 – 23 August 1500), who married John d'Albret (died 1524; he was a grandson of Charles II of Albret and his wife Anne of Armagnac, and a great-grandson of Marie I, Countess of Auvergne) and had a daughter, Marie d'Albret, Countess of Rethel.

John's final marriage was on 11 March 1480, in the château de Châlus-Chabrol (Limousin), to Marie d'Albret (-1521).

Ancestors

Notes

References

Sources

External links

1415 births
1491 deaths
John II
Counts of Eu
Counts of Étampes
John II of
Counts of Rethel
Knights of the Golden Fleece
15th-century peers of France